Audea watusi is a moth of the family Erebidae. It is found in Kenya and Zimbabwe.

References

Moths described in 2005
Audea
Moths of Africa